F/V Andrea Gail was a commercial fishing vessel that was lost at sea with all hands during the Perfect Storm of 1991. The vessel and her six-man crew had been fishing the North Atlantic Ocean out of Gloucester, Massachusetts. The story of Andrea Gail and her crew was the basis of the 1997 book The Perfect Storm by Sebastian Junger, and a 2000 film adaptation of the same name.

F/V Andrea Gail
Andrea Gail was a  commercial fishing vessel constructed in Panama City, Florida, in 1978, and owned by Robert Brown. Her home port was Marblehead, Massachusetts. She also sailed from Gloucester, Massachusetts, where she would offload her catch and reload food and stores for her next run.

Andrea Gail began her final voyage departing from Gloucester Harbor, Massachusetts, on September 20, 1991, bound for the Grand Banks of Newfoundland off the coast of eastern Canada. After poor fishing, Captain Frank W. "Billy" Tyne Jr. headed east to the Flemish Cap, where he believed they would have better luck. Despite weather reports warning of dangerous conditions, Tyne set course for home on October 26–27. The ship's ice machine was malfunctioning and would not have been able to maintain the catch for much longer.

Disappearance
The last reported transmission from Andrea Gail was at about 6:00 pm on October 28, 1991. Tyne's final recorded words were, "She's comin' on, boys, and she's comin' on strong." However, data from a series of weather buoys in the general vicinity of the vessel's last known location recorded peak wave action exceeding  in height from October 28 through 30, 1991.

Search
On October 30, 1991, the vessel was reported overdue. An extensive air and land search was launched by the 106th Rescue Wing from the New York Air National Guard, United States Coast Guard, and Canadian Coast Guard forces.

On November 6, 1991, Andrea Gails emergency position-indicating radio beacon (EPIRB) was discovered washed up on the shore of Sable Island in Nova Scotia. The EPIRB was designed to automatically send out a distress signal upon contact with sea water, but the Canadian Coast Guard personnel who found the beacon "did not conclusively verify whether the control switch was in the on or off position". Authorities called off the search for the missing vessel on November 9, 1991, due to the low probability of crew survival.

Fuel drums, a fuel tank, the EPIRB, an empty life raft, and some other flotsam were the only wreckage found. The ship was presumed lost at sea somewhere along the continental shelf near Sable Island.

Crew
All six of the crew were lost at sea.

 Frank William "Billy" Tyne Jr. (Captain), aged 37, Gloucester, Massachusetts
 Michael "Bugsy" Moran, aged 36, Bradenton Beach, Florida
 Dale R. "Murph" Murphy, aged 30, Bradenton Beach, Florida
 Alfred Pierre, aged 32, New York City
 Robert F. "Bobby" Shatford, aged 30, Gloucester, Massachusetts
 David "Sully" Sullivan, aged 29, New York City

In the media
The story of Andrea Gail and her crew inspired Sebastian Junger's 1997 book, The Perfect Storm, and a 2000 film of the same name. A ship similar to Andrea Gail, Lady Grace, was used during the filming of the movie.
An illustrated nonfiction book about the disaster for middle-school-age youth, The Wreck of the Andrea Gail: Three Days of a Perfect Storm by Gillian Houghton, was published in 2003.
A model of Andrea Gail built by Paul Gran is on display at the Cape Ann Museum in Gloucester.

References

Further reading
 U.S. Investigation into the Disappearance of the Andrea Gail, U.S. Coast Guard
 Lost at sea report, City of Gloucester Government

External links
 Andrea Gail MFV on the wrecksite
 Image of the pilot house
 Image of the refrigerated storage area
 

Shipwrecks in the Atlantic Ocean
Fishing ships of the United States
Maritime incidents in 1991
1978 ships
1991 Perfect Storm
Marblehead, Massachusetts
Ships lost with all hands
Missing ships
Sable Island
Ships built in Panama City, Florida